"I Wouldn't Want to Be Like You" is a song by the British progressive rock band The Alan Parsons Project, featured on their 1977 album I Robot. Written by band leaders Alan Parsons and Eric Woolfson, "I Wouldn't Want to Be Like You" was sung by pop singer Lenny Zakatek, who would go on to sing many of the band's songs. In the United States, the song was a moderate success and charted at #36 on the Billboard Hot 100.

Background
In 1977, the song was released as the lead single from the group's second album, I Robot. The song was a moderate success, charting at #36 on the U.S. Billboard Hot 100 and #22 on the Canadian chart.

Music video
The video, the only one known in which Parsons stars, is based on the album's title, "I Robot".  It begins with Parsons rummaging through a library of reel recording tapes.  Parsons then leaves the library to another room shrouded in a haze.  He happens upon what appears to be a prehistoric mask under a shroud.  Parsons touches it, then begins to peel away the ancient shroud. The haze intensifies then dissipates to reveal a black humanoid head wearing goggles, bearing somewhat of a resemblance to the robot character depicted on the album's cover and disc labels, implying that the being is a robot.  

The scene alternates images from the humanoid head to images of a 1960's era Univac 1108 computer room, with data tape machines.  The humanoid, now seen in full human form wearing black and silver gloves, suddenly appears in the computer room and lowers a door to one of the tape machines.  Parsons then appears and raises his hand to touch the humanoid, which immediately disappears.  A dot-matrix printer generates a page bearing the words 'I Robot', and the lowered door from before raises back to its place with no apparent assistance from anyone.

The humanoid is then seen moving rapidly in an outdoor passageway of a large building, but doing so while remaining perfectly still.  Parsons is seen running in pursuit and attempts to touch the humanoid's shoulder, but the humanoid again disappears.  The humanoid again is seen making movements while still, and Parsons approaches it again, but rather than touching it, he levels an intimidating stare at it.  The humanoid again disappears.  Parsons pursues it, and attempts to touch it again, with the humanoid then disappearing.

The humanoid is seen near what appears to be a bank's automated teller machine (very rare of the time), grasping a transaction receipt.  It's then seen pulling a flower from a large planter and letting it fall to the ground before disappearing again.  Witnessing this, Parsons rushes over to frantically replant the flower.

The cat-and-mouse game between Parsons and the humanoid continue, with the humanoid disappearing when it feels confronted by Parsons.  Finally, Parsons is able to touch the humanoid, leaving his handprint in white on the humanoid's cheek.  Upon doing so, the humanoid enters a state of spontaneous combustion, and then an image is seen again of the computer printout bearing the words 'I Robot'.  Returning to the scene of what appears to be the final showdown between Parsons and the humanoid, Parsons is seen leaving.  The camera then returns to what is assumed to be the still-burning humanoid, leaving behind a residue of burned electronic components as the song ends.

Personnel
Alan Parsons – production, engineering, composer
Eric Woolfson – keyboards, composer, lyrics
Ian Bairnson – guitars
David Paton – bass
Stuart Tosh – drums
Lenny Zakatek – vocals

Charts

In other media 
The song was featured in the initial and subsequent releases of Grand Theft Auto V on the game's classic rock radio station Los Santos Rock Radio.

In 2017, the song was used in the final scene of episode nine of the Netflix series Mindhunter.

References

1977 songs
Arista Records singles
Songs written by Alan Parsons
Songs written by Eric Woolfson
Progressive pop songs
The Alan Parsons Project songs